"Róisín Dubh" ("Dark Rosaleen" or "Little Dark Rose"), written in the 16th century, is one of Ireland's most famous political songs. It is based on an older love-lyric which referred to the poet's beloved rather than, as here, being a metaphor for Ireland. The intimate tone of the original carries over into the political song.  It is often attributed to Antoine Ó Raifteiri, but almost certainly pre-dates him.

Background
The song is named after Róisín Dubh, probably one of the daughters of Aodh Mór Ó Néill, earl of Tyrone in the late 16th Century. The song is reputed to have originated in the camps of Aodh Rua Ó Domhnaill, O'Neill's daughter being either married or betrothed to the O'Donnell leader in their teenage years.

This song is traditionally sung in the Irish language, with only a few recordings of the English existing. It has been translated from the Irish language by James Clarence Mangan and Patrick Pearse. The following translation is by Thomas Kinsella (The New Oxford Book of Irish Verse, 1986).

Renditions
Róisín Dubh has been frequently performed and recorded, both in its own native Irish and translated into English. (However, quality of the translations vary greatly, from strict ones to those bearing no relationship to the original Irish.) It has been sung by numerous Irish traditional singers including the late Joe Heaney and Maighread Ní Dhomhnaill, as well as in genres ranging from classical to rock and jazz.

The instrumental range is as wide as the vocal, but the instruments best suited to render this air authentically are the native Irish uilleann pipes, flute, fiddle, and whistle, as these are capable of making the "caoine" ("cry"), the note-shaping and changing that is characteristic of the native Irish music. However, other versions using different instruments are also widely available.

Musicians/composers who have performed or recorded the song include these:
Joe Heaney, famed Connemara sean-nós singer
The Wolfe Tones recorded it in their debut album The Foggy Dew in 1965 
Paddy Tunney- folk singer and lilter from the county Fermanagh in Ulster
Maighread Ní Dhomhnaill – native Irish singer from the famed Ó Domhnaill singing family of Rann na Feirste, Co. Donegal.
Phil Lynnot of Thin Lizzy
Sinéad O'Connor
Caitlín Maude on her 1975 album Caitlín
Cherish the Ladies 1993
Ann Mulqueen

Instrumental
 Seán Ó Riada, whose score for the 1959 film Mise Éire was based on the melody
 The Dubliners. Instrumental, circa 1964. Also the song "For what died the sons of Róisín".
 Joanie Madden, leader of Cherish the Ladies, tin whistle instrumental on her solo album Song of the Irish Whistle (1997)
 Máire Ní Chathasaigh recorded an instrumental version for solo harp on her duo album with Chris Newman Live in the Highlands (1995)

Others
Thin Lizzy wrote the song "Black Rose" based on the story of Róisín Dubh. This song was covered by Northern Kings on their 2008 album Rethroned.
Flogging Molly recorded the song "To Youth (My Sweet Roisin Dubh)" on the album Within a Mile of Home (2004)
Black 47 recorded a song titled Black Rose for the album Home of the Brave.
The Rubberbandits begin the Irish language version of I Wanna Fight Your Father with a portion of “Róisín Dubh.”

Notes 

Irish folk songs
Personifications of Ireland
Irish-language songs